Kfar Bilu (lit. Bilu Village) is a moshav in central Israel. Located between Rehovot and Kiryat Ekron, it falls under the jurisdiction of Gezer Regional Council.

History
The moshav was founded in 1932 as part of the Settlement of the Thousand plan by a group of workers known as the "Company of the South" (Havurat HaDarom), who had assembled in Rehovot. Its name commemorated fifty years since the first aliyah of Bilu members.

References 

Moshavim
Populated places established in 1932
1932 establishments in Mandatory Palestine
Populated places in Central District (Israel)